Neopyrochroa flabellata is a species of fire-coloured beetles in the genus Neopyrochroa. The species' range is the eastern United States.

Habitat

Larvae live in dead wood and feed on fungus rather than being predatory or eating the wood in which it lives.  Adults rarely eat but have been known to be attracted to cantharidin.

References

Pyrochroidae
Beetles of the United States
Insects described in 1787
Taxa named by Johan Christian Fabricius